Meiacanthus procne, the swallowtail fangblenny, is a species of combtooth blenny found in the Pacific ocean where it is only known from Tonga.  This species grows to a length of  SL.

References

procne
Fish described in 1976